Jordan Rakei (born 23 May 1992) is a New Zealand-Australian musician, singer, songwriter and record producer currently based in London, United Kingdom. Rakei has also released and performed under the moniker Dan Kye.

Early life
Rakei was born in 1992 in the small town of Tokoroa on New Zealand's North Island to a New Zealander mother and a Cook Islands Māori father. At the age of three, Rakei and his family moved to Brisbane, Australia. He lived in Brisbane until he made the move to London in 2015.

Music career

2013–2016: Early career and debut album 
Rakei's first releases were Live at Recording Oasis and Franklin's Room EPs in 2013, self-released, aged 21 years old. Less than a year later in 2014, Rakei releases, Groove Curse EP, was the first release on the Soul Has No Tempo label. Less than a year after this EP, he made the move to London. 

After working with artists such as FKJ and Tom Misch, in December 2015 he was part of a Grammy nomination for his work on Disclosure's track "Masterpiece", released on their 2015 album Caracal.

Rakei released his debut album Cloak through his own label, 4101 Records on 3 June 2016. Later that year, he unveiled his dancefloor alias Dan Kye, and released his first EP, titled Joy, Ease, Lightness, on Rhythm Section records.

2017–2020: Wallflower and subsequent releases 
On 6 June 2017, it was announced that Rakei had signed to Ninja Tune records and would be releasing his next album with them. With this announcement came the release of his new single "Sorceress". Later that month, he made his Glastonbury Festival live debut on the Pussy Parlure stage.

On 22 September 2017, Wallflower was released on Ninja Tune. Wallflower was later shortlisted for Best Australian Album in the 2017 Australian Music Prize. 

A tour of North America in spring 2018 included a performance at SXSW Festival and a live session for Jason Bentley's radio show on KCRW.

In 2018, Rakei released the single "Wildfire", released on 10 May 2018, and also provided the vocals on the 2018 Nightmares on Wax track "Typical".

On 26 February 2019, Rakei released "Mind's Eye", the first single from his then unannounced third album. On 23 April 2019, Rakei announced this new album, titled Origin, and released a new single from it, "Say Something". The album was released on 14 June 2019. Rakei supported the record with a series on music festival dates in Summer 2019 and then began a subsequent world tour, beginning that August in Brisbane and ending in November 2019 in Brooklyn, New York. During the tour, he recorded a set for NPR Music's "Tiny Desk Concerts" series which was published online on 13 January 2020.

2021: What We Call Life
In September 2021, Rakei's fourth studio album What We Call Life was released, preceded by four singles. Rakei said the album is his "most vulnerable and intimate album to date"; something that he attributes to listening to singer-songwriters like Laura Marling, Scott Matthews, Joni Mitchell and John Martyn while writing the record.

Discography

Albums

Compilation albums

Extended plays

Singles

Awards and nominations

AIR Awards
The Australian Independent Record Awards (commonly known informally as AIR Awards) is an annual awards night to recognise, promote and celebrate the success of Australia's Independent Music sector.

|-
| AIR Awards of 2020
| Origin
| Best Independent Soul/R&B Album or EP
| 
|-

Australian Music Prize
The Australian Music Prize (the AMP) is an annual award of $30,000 given to an Australian band or solo artist in recognition of the merit of an album released during the year of award. The commenced in 2005.

|-
| 2017
| Wallflower
| Australian Music Prize
| 
|-

J Award
The J Awards are an annual series of Australian music awards that were established by the Australian Broadcasting Corporation's youth-focused radio station Triple J. They commenced in 2005.

|-
| J Awards of 2016
| himself
| Double J Artist of the Year
|

References

External links
 Official website

New Zealand guitarists
New Zealand keyboardists
New Zealand male singer-songwriters
New Zealand singer-songwriters
New Zealand record producers
Cook Island Māori people
Ninja Tune artists
1992 births
Living people